Umbilicaria mammulata, or smooth rock tripe, is a foliose lichen found on boulders and rock walls.

Description

Umbilicaria mammulata is among the largest lichens in the world. The thallus of U. mammulata is usually  in diameter, but specimens have been known to reach  in the Smoky Mountains of Tennessee.  The smooth upper surface is a reddish-brown to grayish-brown color and the lower surface is pitch black.

Ecology

This species is found on boulders and steep rock walls in forests and around lakes.  It grows on several types of rock substrate, such as acidic rock, sandstone, quartz, and granitic rock. Like most lichens, U. mammulata is sensitive to air and water quality. If conditions are optimal, seeing rocks or cliffs covered in dinner plate-sized thalli is not unusual. However, it has been suggested that U. mammulata is not as sensitive to pH and water quality as it is to the frequency and duration of precipitation.

Gallery

References

mammulata
Lichen species
Lichens described in 1814
Lichens of Europe
Lichens of North America
Taxa named by Erik Acharius